Aestuariispira insulae  is a Gram-negative, aerobic and non-motile bacteria from the genus of Aestuariispira which has been isolated from tidal flat from the Aphae island in Korea.

References

Further reading 
 

Rhodospirillales
Bacteria described in 2014